The 1991 Prudential-Bache Securities Classic was a men's tennis tournament played on outdoor hard courts in Orlando, Florida, United States that was part of the ATP World Series of the 1991 ATP Tour. It was the seventh edition of the tournament and took place from April 1 through April 7, 1991. First-seeded Andre Agassi won the singles title, his second at the event after 1989.

Finals

Singles

 Andre Agassi defeated  Derrick Rostagno 6–2, 1–6, 6–3
 It was Agassi's 1st singles title of the year, and the 13th of his career.

Doubles

 Luke Jensen /  Scott Melville defeated  Nicolás Pereira /  Pete Sampras 6–7(5–7), 7–6(8–6), 6–3

References

External links
 ITF tournament edition details

Prudential-Bache Securities Classic